Keri Lynn Sanchez (formerly Raygor; born December 25, 1972) is an American former soccer defender who last played for Los Angeles Sol of Women's Professional Soccer and is a former member of the United States women's national soccer team.  Sanchez is currently the head coach of the Colorado College Tigers women's soccer team.

She was a dual sport athlete at Santa Teresa High School in San Jose, California, where she also excelled in track and field.  At the CIF California State Meet, between 1988 and 1990, she achieved three second place and three third-place finishes spread between hurdles, long jump and triple jump.

References

External links
 Los Angeles Sol player profile
 San Jose CyberRays player profile
 SoccerTimes profile

1972 births
Los Angeles Sol players
American women's soccer players
American people of Mexican descent
North Carolina Tar Heels women's soccer players
Living people
San Jose CyberRays players
Soccer players from San Jose, California
Track and field athletes from San Jose, California
Suzuyo Shimizu FC Lovely Ladies players
Nadeshiko League players
Expatriate women's footballers in Japan
American expatriate women's soccer players
Boston Breakers (WUSA) players
Women's United Soccer Association players
Women's Professional Soccer players
American expatriate sportspeople in Japan
Women's association football defenders
Santa Teresa High School alumni
California Storm players
Women's Premier Soccer League players
United States women's international soccer players